Events from the year 1661 in the Qing dynasty.

Incumbents 
 Shunzhi Emperor (17th year)
 Kangxi Emperor  
 Regents — Sonin, Ebilun, Suksaha, and Oboi

Viceroys
 Viceroy of Zhili — Miao Cheng
 Viceroy of Min-Zhe — Zhao Guozuo, Zhao Tingchen
 Viceroy of Huguang — Zhang Changgeng
 Viceroy of Shaan-Chuan — Bai Rumei
 Viceroy of Guangdong — Li Qifeng
 Viceroy of Guangxi  — Yu Shiyue
 Viceroy of Yun-Gui — Zhao Tingchen 
 Viceroy of Guizhou — Tong Yannian, Yang Maoxun
 Viceroy of Yunnan — Bian Sanyuan
 Viceroy of Sichuan — Li Guoying
 Viceroy of Liangjiang/Jiangnan —  Lang Tingzuo
 Viceroy of Jiangxi — Zhang Chaolin

Events 
 Shunzhi Emperor dies, probably of smallpox. The seven-year-old Kangxi Emperor ascends the throne and the Four Regents, previously nominated in Shunzhi's will, begin rule as regents.
 The Thirteen Offices of the are eliminated (and eunuch Wu Liangfu executed) by Oboi and the other regents in March 1661.
 March — Koxinga's fleet set sail from Kinmen with hundreds of junks of various sizes, with roughly 25,000 soldiers and sailors aboard. They arrived at Penghu the next day and attack Dutch forces shortly after
 On March 30, the Siege of Fort Zeelandia on the Taiwan main island begins
 Khagan of Northern Yuan dynasty Ejei Khan dies and is succeeded by his brother Abunai, who shows disaffection with Manchu Qing rule
 Sino-Russian border conflicts

Deaths 
 Ejei Khan, (? – 1662) the son of Ligdan Khan, the last in the Borjigin clan of Mongol Khans, who once established the Mongol Empire in the 13th century. Northern Yuan dynasty, existed as remnants of the Yuan dynasty, ended a few years after

References

 .
 .
 

 
China